Dundee Airport  is located  from the centre of Dundee, Scotland or, for navigation purposes,  south of the city. It lies on the shore of the Firth of Tay and overlooks the Tay Rail Bridge.

It is a popular transport hub for golf players, as it is the closest airport to the championship courses at St Andrews, Gleneagles and Carnoustie.  During international competitions, the airport is often at its busiest with charter and private aircraft. There are also flights operated by Loganair - Scotland's Airline.

History
The airport was opened in 1963 on land reclaimed from the Firth of Tay. Originally it had a   grass runway. The first scheduled air service began on 5 July 1966, with a service to Glasgow. A fortnight later a feeder service was added for Edinburgh and Prestwick. The service was stopped on 31 October 1967 after British Eagle reported £10,000 losses. Around this time the control of Dundee City Council changed from Labour to Conservative, and the airport was closed and the land used by Dundee University as playing fields. When control of the Council changed back again to Labour the airport was reopened.

The airport was granted "customs airport" status on 16 April 1982 and runway edge lights were added in 1983. The current terminal was opened in 1997 by the then EU transport commissioner Neil Kinnock.

During the 1980s Air Ecosse operated services to Aberdeen, Carlisle, Manchester, and Esbjerg using Short 330 and Short 360 aircraft. This included a 360 in the Royal Mail Special Services "Datapost" colour scheme.

Ramsay World Travel from Dundee also operated a weekly charter to Jersey in the summer months in association with Lewis's Holidays, and in 1996 they ran a series of weekly flights to Majorca using BAe 146 aircraft which had to land in Bournemouth/Southend to re-fuel.

Business Air and later British Midland Regional operated flights from Dundee to Manchester Airport in the 1990s, a route that was brought back by Eastern Airways for only a few months, in 2002.

After the departure of Business Air, the airport was left without any scheduled services for almost a year until April 1999 - 2007, when ScotAirways introduced flights to London City Airport.

ScotAirways then operated under the CityJet banner for Air France from 2007 to September 2009.

In September 2009 CityJet became a commercial brand within the AFKL Group. Flights were announced as CityJet and not Air France.

The Dundee to London City route was flown by Dornier 328 aircraft leased from ScotAirways, until January 2011 when ScotAirways near 12-year association with the route came to an end, as CityJet announced the route would be operated on a reduced frequency by its own Fokker 50 aircraft. This change caused concern within the business community for the continued viability of the route.  However following the purchase of ScotAirways by Loganair in July 2011, the Dornier 328 was reinstated on the London City route.

On 29 May 2007, services to Birmingham and Belfast City operated by FlyWhoosh, using ATR 42 aircraft, started. The company, which was effectively only a ticket agent, used the services of a Polish airline White Eagle Aviation (WEA), which based an aircraft at Dundee Airport. In December 2007 these services ceased, amid some confusion as to what exactly caused the termination of services.

On 3 March 2008, Loganair announced that it would recommence the routes that had been operated by FlyWhoosh in May 2008, under the new Flybe franchise. Three weekday return flights were introduced between Dundee and Birmingham, with one return flight on Sundays and a daily weekday return flight between Dundee and Belfast City Airport, with one return flight also operating on Sundays. The company used Saab 340 aircraft on these routes.

In October 2012, Loganair announced the closure of flights to Belfast City and Birmingham on behalf of Flybe, because of decline in passengers loads and high fuel costs as the reason for closure, leaving CityJet with its route to London-City as the only scheduled carrier in Dundee.

December 2013, CityJet announced it would be dropping the last remaining scheduled route from Dundee to London City Airport in March 2014, putting the airport's future in doubt.

January 2014, HIAL announced that Loganair with its Flybe franchise would take over from City Jet and commence twice-daily flights to London Stansted, once the London City route had withdrawn in March 2014 by City Jet.

Loganair 
In September 2017 Loganair became an independent airline operating in its own right. Experts said this would give the airline more freedom to operate more flights, and speculated that Dundee would figure among these additional flights. As of May 2022 the airline currently operates to London City, Belfast City & Sumburgh airports, using an ATR 42-500 with capacity of 48 seats.

Tayside Aviation 
Tayside Aviation operates a training facility and engineering workshop at the airport. This was supplemented by a maintenance hangar built in 1982. Their operations form the substantial part of the light aircraft movements at the airport, being, among other things, sole contractor to the Air Cadet Organisation to provide Light Aircraft Flying Scholarships to RAF cadets.

Dundee City Council and HIAL 
Dundee Airport had been operating at a loss of over £2 million per year from 2004 to 2007 and in the first full financial year of operation under HIAL, 2008/9, the airport's loss was £2.6 million.

On 12 February 2007 it was announced that, from September 2007, the City Council would hand over the running of the airport to Highlands and Islands Airports Limited (HIAL). The takeover took place on 1 December 2007.

Any additional scheduled flights at the airport would be limited by runway length to regional aircraft. Larger aircraft used by low-cost airlines, such as Boeing 737s, require longer runways. The largest aircraft that can land at the airport are the BAe 146 and the Airbus A318.

Flybe controversy 
On 8 August 2008, HIAL and airport bosses announced that they were considering a direct air link to Amsterdam.  In late October 2008, an article was placed in the Evening Telegraph concerning the possibility of flights to and from Spain. The airport operator had also stated that the A318 was fully compatible for Dundee Airport and could be used to operate these flights.

In 2016, Flybe announced Dundee's first direct international flight to Amsterdam, which started on 23 May 2016 and was operated with a 78-seater Bombardier Dash 8 Q400 aircraft.  The initial 5-weekly return flight was funded through the regional connectivity fund, operating through the Department for Transport's public service obligation scheme.

On 19 November, Flybe suspended the route as part of a review of the airline's operations at Dundee Airport. All passengers booked on the route were transported to Edinburgh Airport and rebooked on a flight from Edinburgh to Amsterdam. The suspension was due to be lifted on 16 December; however, this did not materialise. It was announced on Friday 23 December 2016 that the flights to Amsterdam would be cut in 2017, as Flybe believed that the radar coverage was not adequate.  Flybe stated that it would return to Dundee only when an improved radar system was installed.  While it is unlikely that an improved Secondary Surveillance Radar system will be installed, newer lower-cost technologies such as Multilateration and ADS-B are being investigated.

Many local people questioned Flybe's decision to withdraw the flights when it was reported that flights were fully booked up until February 2017.

Airline and destinations

The following airline operates regular scheduled flights to and from Dundee:

Statistics and traffic

Annual traffic statistics 

Scheduled flights were suspended for periods throughout 2020 due to the COVID-19 pandemic, therefore resulting in significantly reduced passenger numbers for the year.

Busiest routes

Perth Airport incursion
This procedure is used by Dundee commercial and training traffic irrespective of the runway in use. In an easterly wind, traffic may go as far west as the Perth overhead.

Ground transport

Road
The airport lies on the main A85 Riverside Drive, which links the city centre to the Kingsway and the A90, with the airport approximately 2 miles from the city centre itself. Taxis are available from outside the airport.

Bus
Dundee Airport is a short taxi ride from the main Dundee bus station. Direct buses to many other major destinations are available from the station. Chartered buses can also be booked with local operators.

Rail
The airport is also a short drive from Dundee railway station. The station is situated on the East Coast Main Line to Aberdeen, Edinburgh, Leeds and London, and is also on the Glasgow–Aberdeen line serving Glasgow and further afield. Dundee Station is served by ScotRail, London North Eastern Railway, the Caledonian Sleeper and CrossCountry.

Accidents and incidents
 On 24 October 2003, a U.S.-registered six-seater TBM 700 came down 200 metres short of the runway in the Tay Estuary.  The hovercraft was deployed and the occupants were rescued from the aircraft in around 15 minutes. The four people on board received only minor injuries.
 On 6 June 2005, an instructor and trainee escaped uninjured when a Grob G 115 crashed through a fence at Dundee Airport after the novice got into difficulties.  The plane was extensively damaged in the accident.
 On 3 May 2015, two men died in a G-Rick Beech Baron aircraft near Abernyte, Scotland which was due to land at Dundee Airport at midday. The wreckage was found at about 4pm. The plane was thought to have been travelling from Inverness to Dundee, which is a base for light aircraft.

References

External links
 

1963 establishments in Scotland
Airports in Scotland
Buildings and structures in Dundee
Transport in Dundee
Highlands and Islands Airports
Airports established in 1963